Until June (originally Juune) is an American alternative-rock band, from the Hollywood district of Los Angeles, California. Formed in 2001 are currently signed of Tooth and Nail Records.

They are known for their song "What I've Done", which made the top-ten songs on contemporary hit radio chart and was used for ABC's "Private Practice" television series and ABC's Grey's Anatomy season 3 DVD. Their song "In My Head" was featured in Grey's Anatomy season 6 episode 3.

The band is also known for their song "Sleepless" which reached number one in Greece in June and July 2008 and number four in Norway in June 2008.

The band released their second album Young and Foolish on August 21, 2012, on Madison Line Records.

Background
Josh Ballard, Dan Ballard, Chris Foley, and Justin Turley self-produced and released several EPs and played many shows in the Hollywood area, under the name Juune. To get the attention of major labels, they hopped "the fence at Capitol Records and put flyers on cars" said Josh Ballard. They set a deadline of being signed by June 2005 or they would break up.

In the spring of 2004, drummer Turley left the band to move closer to his family in Texas, and he was replaced by Jamie Pitts. The band continued to self-produce and release EPs and label interest began growing in late 2004.

In the spring of 2005, as the band was in the early stages of negotiating with several labels, Foley left the band to get married, and Pitts left to continue pursuing his academic goals. Daniel Dempsey joined the band shortly thereafter.

In August 2005, the band signed with Flicker Records of the Sony BMG's Provident Label Group. Due to legal concerns, the name Juune was changed to Until June after their original deadline.

Their self-titled debut extended play, Until June – The EP, featuring Josh Ballard on keyboards and vocals, Dan Ballard on guitar, Dempsey on drums, and Foley on bass, was released in March 2006.

Their debut studio album, Until June, was produced by Brian Garcia and was released on April 17, 2007.

The band's first international success was in Greece when the single, "Sleepless", topped the radio charts on May 8, 2008.

In late 2008, the band left Flicker to sign with Authentik Artists.

The band was planning on releasing their second album in 2010, which might be entitled www. Mixing of the album was reportedly completed March 27, 2010. However, the band posted a status update on May 11, 2010, noting "Re-doing a few guitar tracks for www It's sounding quite lovely." Mariah McManus sings backing vocals on one of the songs. On May 19, 2010, the band gave an album update, stating "It's official now. Finally after two years the second full length UJ record is done.". As of June 15, 2010, the album was "coming soon".

The band's album, Young and Foolish, was released August 21, 2012. The trio produced the album themselves, but brought in Grammy Award-winning mixer Kevin Killen, to help achieve the "atmospheric blend".

Discography

Studio albums
 Until June (2007)
 Young and Foolish (2012)

Extended plays
 Until June – The EP
 Sound of Defeat (2009)

As Juune:
 Juune EP - May 2002
 The Blue EP - March 2003
 The Red EP - January 2003
 Unnoticed EP - August 2003
 Why Not Stop EP - June 2004
 My Luck's Run Out EP - (never released) January 2005

Featured television series spots
 "What I've Done" featured on ABC's Private Practice commercials fall 2007
 "What I've Done" featured on ABC's Grey's Anatomy DVD season 3 box set
 "In My Head" featured on ABC's Grey's Anatomy Season 6 episode 603 (October 1, 2009)
 "You Do" featured on CW Gossip Girl

Singles
 "What I've Done" number 4 (December 21, 2007, R&R)
 "Sleepless'" number one, Greece (May 8 and May 15, 2008, R&R)
 "Sleepless" number 4, Norway (July 2008)
 "What Went Wrong" (August 2012)

Members
 Josh Ballard - vocals, piano, keyboards
 Dan Ballard - guitar, backing vocals
 Daniel Dempsey - drums (2005-)

Former members
 Chris Foley - bass (2001-2005)
 Justin Turley - drums, backing vocals (2001-2004)
 Jamie Pitts - drums (2004-2005)

See also

 List of alternative-rock bands
 List of bands from Los Angeles
 Music of Los Angeles

References

External links
 

2001 establishments in California
Alternative rock groups from California
Flicker Records artists
People from Hollywood, Los Angeles
Musical groups from Los Angeles
Musical groups established in 2001
Sony BMG artists